Manyas is a town and district of Balıkesir Province in the Marmara region of Turkey. The population was 6,501 in 2010. The mayor is Tancan Barçın (CHP).

Pictures from Manyas Birds' Heaven

References

 
Populated places in Balıkesir Province
Districts of Balıkesir Province